Olena Volodymyrivna Zerkal (born 24 June 1973), widely known as Lana Zerkal, is a Ukrainian diplomat. Former Deputy Minister of Foreign Affairs of Ukraine for the European Integration, appointed in office in 2014. She also served for 12 years at the Ministry of Justice (Ukraine) since 2001 as the Director of the Department of International Law (2001 – 2005), Director of the State Department on Approximation of Legislation (2005 – 2011) and as the Director of the Department on Liaison with State Authorities (2011 – 2013).

Biography

In 1998 Olena graduated from the Law Faculty of the Taras Shevchenko National University of Kyiv with a Master of Law. In 2008 she also obtained a Master of International Economic Relations degree. She speaks fluent English and basic French.

Career

From 01.1991 to 02.1992 - laboratory assistant at Taras Shevchenko National University of Kyiv.

From 02.1992 to 05.1994 - Secretary General Director of "Insoftteh".

From 05.1994 to 06.2000 - legal adviser of CJSC "Ukrpobuttehnika".

From 12.2001 to 01.2005 - Deputy Director, Director of International Law of the Ministry of Justice (Ukraine).

From 01.2005 to 04.2011 - Director of the State Department for Legal Approximation of the Ministry of Justice (Ukraine).

In 2005 - delegate of Ukraine at the conference of Ukraine and Poland on European integration.

In 2006 - member of the Standing Ukrainian-Lithuanian commission for European integration.

From 2007 to 2013 - Ukrainian delegation member on Association Agreement between Ukraine and the European Union.

In 2008 - Ukrainian delegate in negotiations with the European Commission on the Framework Agreement between the European Community and Ukraine on the general principles of Ukraine's participation in the Community programs.

In 2010 - Ukrainian delegation member in negotiations with the European Commission regarding amendment of the Agreement between Ukraine and the EU on visa facilitation.

From 04.2011 to 05.2013 - Director of interaction with the authorities of the Ministry of Justice (Ukraine).

Since 2011 - member of the board of the State Penitentiary Service of Ukraine.

In 2012 - a member of the Interagency Coordinating Council for the construction of an electronic register of patients of Ministry of Healthcare (Ukraine).

Since 2012 - member of the board of the State Registration Service of Ukraine.

10 April 2013 - participant in the Verkhovna Rada session on Human Rights, National Minorities and International Relations.

Deputy Foreign Minister, 2014–2019

Olena was appointed Deputy Minister of Foreign Affairs of Ukraine on 20 August 2014, as one of the most experienced professionals in the field of European integration. She participated in all negotiations rounds on political and economic parts of the Association Agreement, representing the Ministry of Justice of Ukraine during the process.

Olena also represented Ukraine from 6 March – 9 March 2017 at the International Court of Justice in The Hague, during public hearings on the case of Ukraine accusing Russia of supporting international terrorism and violation of human rights in occupied and uncontrolled territories of Ukraine, including Crimea and parts of Donbas.

Olena is the Agent of Ukraine in Dispute Concerning Coastal State Rights in the Black Sea, Sea of Azov, and Kerch Strait (Ukraine v. the Russian Federation). Under a presidential decrees signed 
on 21 May 2019 by newly inaugurated President Volodymyr Zelensky Zerkal was appointed Deputy Head of the Presidential Administration of Ukraine. But a few hours later the text of the decree disappeared from the site of the president, according  to Ukrayinska Pravda Zerkal did agree to be the only authorized representative of the international courts of Ukraine concerning Russia, but not to be a deputy head of the administration.

Other activities
 World Economic Forum (WEF), Member of the Europe Policy Group (since 2017)

Recognition
  : Distinguished Lawyer of Ukraine
  : Honorable Certificate of Cabinet of Minister of Ukraine
  : Insignia of the Ministry of Justice of Ukraine "For Merits" (August 2012)
  : State employee, 3rd rank (April 2009)
  : State employee, 5th rank (March 2005)

References

External links
 
 
 Official page of Ministry of Foreign Affairs of Ukraine
 The management of the Ministry of Foreign Affairs of Ukraine
 Economic Forum 2011. Panel: «Association Agreement: On the Way to European Integration» Foto: Petr Poroshenko, Olena Zerkal and Andrey Popov
 Ukrainian Foreign Ministry: Association Agreement action plan scheduled for 2014–2017

1973 births
Foreign ministers of Ukraine
Independent politicians in Ukraine
Living people
People of the Euromaidan
Pro-Ukrainian people of the 2014 pro-Russian unrest in Ukraine
21st-century Ukrainian politicians
20th-century Ukrainian politicians
Taras Shevchenko National University of Kyiv alumni
Ukrainian anti-communists
Pro-Ukrainian people of the war in Donbas
21st-century Ukrainian women politicians
20th-century Ukrainian women politicians
Ukrainian diplomats
Ukrainian women diplomats
Women government ministers of Ukraine
Recipients of the Honorary Diploma of the Cabinet of Ministers of Ukraine